Wellington is a small village in the civil parish of Gosforth, Borough of Copeland, Cumbria, England, lying north east of Gosforth beside the River Bleng A bridge at Wellington carries the Gosforth to Wasdale road over the river.  Hall Croft, Wellington, is a late 18th- or early 19th-century house and a grade II listed building.

References

Villages in Cumbria
Gosforth, Cumbria